Fransy Ochoa (born 13 September 1990) is a Cuban basketball player for Villa Clara Basketball and the Cuban national team, where she participated at the 2014 FIBA World Championship.

She was a member of the team which competed for Cuba at the 2015 Pan American Games, winning a bronze medal.

References

1990 births
Living people
Cuban women's basketball players
Forwards (basketball)
Basketball players at the 2015 Pan American Games
Pan American Games bronze medalists for Cuba
Pan American Games medalists in basketball
Medalists at the 2015 Pan American Games